Claudio Lustenberger (born 6 January 1987) is a Swiss former professional footballer who played as a defender. Before joining Luzern, he played for local rivals Kriens.

References

External links
Weltfussball profile 

1987 births
Living people
Swiss men's footballers
Switzerland under-21 international footballers
SC Kriens players
FC Luzern players
Swiss Super League players
Swiss Challenge League players
Association football defenders